The Mitsubishi Airtrek is a battery-electric compact crossover SUV produced by GAC Mitsubishi, a joint venture of Guangzhou Automobile Corporation and Mitsubishi Motors since 2021.

Overview 

The Airtrek was revealed at Auto Guangzhou in November 2021 after previewing the Airtrek as a namesake concept in April 2021 at Auto Shanghai. It is based on the same platform as the Aion V and features Level 2 semi-autonomous driving functionality using nine radars and cameras for accelerate, brake, and lane assist functions.

The Airtrek is expected to go on sale exclusively in China in early 2022.

Powertrain 
Driving dynamics are aided by a low-mounted battery with a low-positioned center of mass and a 50:50 weight distribution.

References

External links 

  (in Chinese)

Airtrek
Cars introduced in 2021
Compact sport utility vehicles
Crossover sport utility vehicles
Production electric cars
Front-wheel-drive vehicles